AFFC may refer to:

 A Feast for Crows, a novel by George R. R. Martin
 Appleby Frodingham F.C., an English football club
 Airport Freight Forwarding Centre, a warehousing and office facility in Hong Kong International Airport
 Albert Foundry F.C., a Northern Irish football club